The Jawaharlal Nehru Botanical Garden is a botanical garden in Srinagar, Jammu and Kashmir, India, which was established in 1987. It was created in memory of India's first prime minister. It contains many types of plants and vegetation. This garden has a collection of about 150,00 ornamental plants and a huge collection of oak varieties.  

This garden is located on the side of a mountain and near to Chashma Shahi, Roop Bhavani Temple, etc. Many people from various areas of world visit this place. It has four main divisions: the Plant Introduction Centre, the Research Section, the Recreational Garden and the Botanical Garden.

Gallery

References

Botanical gardens in India
Gardens in Jammu and Kashmir
Monuments and memorials to Jawaharlal Nehru
Tourist attractions in Srinagar district